The 1972 American 500 was a NASCAR Winston Cup Series racing event held on October 22, 1972, at North Carolina Motor Speedway in Rockingham, North Carolina. While not televised, the 1972 American 500 was covered by local radio stations WAYN-AM (900 AM) and WEEB-AM (990 AM).

Race report
40 American-born drivers qualified for the race. Drivers who failed to qualify were David Ray Boggs, Jimmy Crawford and Elmo Langley. Forty-two thousand people attended. David Pearson's qualifying speed of  won the pole position. There were four cautions for a of 35 laps. 20 different drivers lead the race. Bobby Allison would defeat Richard Petty by two laps; resulting in Richard Petty's 100th runner up finish.

Ron Hutcherson was the last-place finisher of this event; with a racing accident on lap 29 out of 492. Richard Petty, Bobby Allison, and David Pearson dominated the closing laps of this race. Pete Hamilton scored his final top-5 finish. This was his final start of 1972 and he would only make two further starts in 1973, both of which ended in DNFs

Hutcherson's racing career would last throughout the course of the 1970s; ending only after the 1979 running of the World 600. Notable crew chiefs for this race were Harry Hyde, Dale Inman, Tom Vandiver, Vic Ballard, and Herb Nab.

Rewards for this race were $19,400 for the winner ($ when adjusted for inflation) while the last-place finisher brought home $550 ($ when adjusted for inflation). A grand total of $89,450 was offered to the race. ($ when adjusted for inflation).

Bobby Allison's win at this event would become the tenth win of the 1972 NASCAR Winston Cup Series season. Due to the cash crunch of the 1970s, only five individual owners could afford to employ a NASCAR Cup Series driver for the rest; the rest were all "proper" NASCAR teams with more than one person running them.

Qualifying

Finishing order

 Bobby Allison
 Richard Petty
 Buddy Baker
 David Pearson
 Pete Hamilton
 Cale Yarborough
 Dave Marcis
 Larry Smith
 David Sisco
 Buddy Arrington
 John Sears
 Clarence Lovell
 Elmo Langley
 Ben Arnold
 Walter Ballard
 Dean Dalton
 Ed Negre
 Charlie Roberts
 James Hylton
 Cecil Gordon
 Joe Frasson
 Raymond Williams
 Jabe Thomas
 J.D. McDuffie
 Frank Warren
 Marty Robbins
 Coo Coo Marlin
 Bill Champion
 Roy Mayne
 Jim Vandiver
 Neil Castles
 Bill Dennis
 Ron Keselowski
 Dick Brooks
 Benny Parsons
 Bobby Isaac
 Henley Gray
 Tiny Lund
 Tommy Gale
 Ron Hutcherson

Timeline
Section reference: 
 Start: David Pearson was the first driver to leave the start/finish line as the green flag was waved in the air.
 Lap 32: First caution due to Ron Hutcherson's accident on turn 4, ended on lap 42.
 Lap 33: Bill Dennis took over the lead from David Pearson.
 Lap 34: Bobby Isaac took over the lead from Bill Dennis.
 Lap 35: Bobby Allison took over the lead from Bobby Isaac.
 Lap 42: Cale Yarborough took over the lead from Bobby Allison.
 Lap 51: Buddy Baker took over the lead from Cale Yarborough.
 Lap 66: Second caution due to Henley Gray's engine failure, ended on lap 75.
 Lap 67: Dick Brooks took over the lead from Buddy Baker.
 Lap 68: Bill Dennis took over the lead from Dick Brooks.
 Lap 69: David Pearson took over the lead from Bill Dennis.
 Lap 91: The third caution started due to Benny Parson's accident on turn 1, ended on lap 101.
 Lap 92: Bobby Allison took over the lead from David Pearson.
 Lap 97: David Pearson took over the lead from Bobby Allison.
 Lap 100: Buddy Baker took over the lead from David Pearson.
 Lap 167: David Pearson took over the lead from Buddy Baker.
 Lap 187: Bobby Allison took over the lead from David Pearson.
 Lap 213: Richard Petty took over the lead from Bobby Allison.
 Lap 250: The fourth caution started due to debris, ended on lap 256.
 Lap 251: Bobby Allison took over the lead from Richard Petty.
 Lap 252: Richard Petty took over the lead from Bobby Allison.
 Lap 259: Bobby Allison took over the lead from Richard Petty.
 Lap 261: Richard Petty took over the lead from Bobby Allison.
 Lap 269: David Pearson took over the lead from Richard Petty.
 Lap 317: Bobby Allison took over the lead from David Pearson.
 Lap 418: Jabe Thomas' engine stopped functioning in a normal manner.
 Lap 428: The rear end of James Hylton's vehicle was removed in an unsafe manner.
 Finish: Bobby Allison was officially declared the winner of the event.

References

American 500
American 500
NASCAR races at Rockingham Speedway